Alexandra Gavrilovna Snezhko-Blotskaya (Russian: Александра Гавриловна Снежко-Блоцкая, 21 February 1909 in Volchansk, Russian Empire – 29 December 1980 in Moscow Oblast, Soviet Union) was a Soviet animated film director. She was a longtime collaborator with Ivan Ivanov-Vano.

Biography
Snezhko-Blotskaya was born in Volchansk near Kharkov (modern Ukraine), before her family moved to Shatura, near Moscow. There she graduated from art studios of Ivan Rerberg and Ilya Mashkov.

Snezhko-Blotskaya started her film career as designer for Soyuzkinokhronika in 1932. Since 1936, she became a constant collaborator and aide to Ivan Ivanov-Vano, a patriarch of Russian animation. Snezhko-Blotskaya participated as a co-director in many of his films including famous The Humpbacked Horse and The Snow Maiden. Her first solo feature-length film was The Enchanted Boy (1955), based on The Wonderful Adventures of Nils by Selma Lagerlöf.

Most of Snezhko-Blotskaya's films were fantasy based on folk tales and books by authors like Alexander Pushkin and Rudyard Kipling. In the 1970s she directed a series of five animated shorts based on Greek mythology.

Snezhko-Blotskaya died in 1980 at the age of 71 at her home in Zheleznodorozhny, Moscow Oblast.

Filmography

Second unit director for Ivanov-Vano

 1949 — Geese-Swans (Гуси-лебеди) - based on Russian folklore.
 1951 — The Tale of the Dead Tsarevna and Seven Bogatyrs (Сказка о мёртвой царевне и о семи богатырях) - based on a poem by Alexander Pushkin.
 1952 — Snegurochka (Снегурочка)  based on a play by Alexander Ostrovsky.

Solo director
 1954 — Orange Throat (Оранжевое горлышко) - based on a story by Vitaly Bianki.
 1955 — The Enchanted Boy (Заколдованный мальчик) - based on a novel by Selma Lagerlöf.
 1957 — Verlioka (Верлиока) - based on east Slavic folklore.
 1958 — The Tale of Malchish-Kibalchish (Сказка о Мальчише-Кибальчише) - based on a story by Arkady Gaidar.
 1959 — The Amber Castle (Янтарный замок) - based on Lithuanian folklore.
1961 — The Dragon (Дракон) - based on Vietnamese folklore.
1962 — The Wonderful Garden (Чудесный сад) - based on Kazakh folklore.
1963 — Barankin, Be a Human! (Баранкин, будь человеком!) - based on a story by Valery Medvedev.
1963 — Sun's Daughter (Дочь солнца)
1965 — Rikki-Tikki-Tavi (Рикки-тикки-тави) - based on a story by Rudyard Kipling
1967 — The Tale of the Golden Cockerel (Сказка о золотом петушке) - based on a poem by Alexander Pushkin.
1968 — The Cat Who Walked By Himself (Кот, который гулял сам по себе) - based on a story by Rudyard Kipling
 Films based on Greek mythology:
1969 — The Return from Olympus (Возвращение с Олимпа)
1971 — The Labyrinth (Лабиринт)
1971 — Argonauths (Аргонавты)
1973 — Perseus (Персей)
1974 — Prometheus (Прометей)

See also
 Brumberg sisters

External links
 Biography (in Russian) by director's daughter
 

Soviet film directors
1909 births
1980 deaths
Soviet animators
Soviet animation directors
Film people from Kharkiv